Barnawartha is a small town located on the Hume Highway in regional north-east Victoria, Australia, approximately  from Melbourne on the banks of Indigo Creek which runs into the Murray River to the north. Barnawartha commercial centre is located around the High Street, the indigo creek park accessed via High Street fronts the creek of the same name and includes a recently rebuilt public toilet, BBQ facilities and a walking track.

History
The township was surveyed in 1857 by Assistant Surveyor William Snell Chauncy. 
It was settled in 1860, the Post Office opening on 1 August 1860.
Gustav and William Baumgarten were large land owners in Barnawartha prior to the township being settled. After serving prison time for receiving stolen horses from the infamous Ned Kelly, William developed a large winery called Bogong, on the Murray River.

Historic resources
The town contains a few historic buildings, such as the Indian owned and ran general store and Cheesely's Bootmakers shop (now used to store hay) a burnt and rebuilt pub, and a post office.

Education
There is a primary school located in Barnawartha that provides education from prep to year 6.

Sports
Golfers play at the Barnawartha Golf Club at the Havelock Street Recreation Reserve. 

Barnawartha is also home to the local Indigo Creek Fishing Club.

Barnawartha Football Netball Club
Barnawartha has an Australian Rules football team that currently competes in the Tallangatta & District Football League (T&DFNL) and the club's first recorded match was in 1894 against Gooramadda.
The club played a few friendly matches most years against other local towns between 1894 and 1909 prior to joining the Ovens and Murray Junior Football Association in 1910 and lost the 1911 Rutherglen & District Football Association grand final to Howlong. 

Barnwartha then played in the Chiltern & District Football Association from 1912 to 1915, 1920 to 1940, 1945 to 1957. The club then joined the T&DFNL in 1958.

Attractions 
Nearing Barnawartha and covering 21,565 hectares, Mt Pilot National Park includes the striking Mt Pilot Range, Woolshed Falls, box-ironbark forests and several historic goldmining sites.
local waterways and mountains include Frying Pan Creek, Indigo Creek and Mount Lady Franklin.

In the nearby area there are several nearby public accessible river access and camping grounds, this includes Richardson's bend often referred by the locals as Richos is a Dispersed bush camping ground along the bank of the Murray. 
this provides close to the entrance to the reserve water access for boating

References

Links
Barnawartha FNC website
1939 - Barnawartha FC team photo
1946 - Barnawartha / Chiltern FC team football

Towns in Victoria (Australia)
Shire of Indigo
Hume Highway